Sirayaic languages is one of the sub-branches of the Formosan branch, under the Austronesian languages family. Both Blust (1999) and Li (2010) considers Proto-Siraya belongs to East Formosan languages, along with Kavalanic and Amis languages.

The Proto-Siraya language is the reconstructed ancestor of the Siraiyac branch. Proto-Siraya includes at least three languages: Siraya, Taivoan, and Makatao. Li claimed Proto-Siraya might have split from the other East Formosan languages around 3,500 years ago, and began to develop nowadays Siraya, Taivoan, and Makatao 3,000 years ago.

Classification 

Raleigh Farrell (1971) believes there were at least five indigenous peoples in the south-western plain of Taiwan at that time:

 Siraya

 Tevorang-Taivuan

 Takaraian (now classified as Makatao)

 Pangsoia-Dolatok (now classified as Makatao)

 Longkiau (now classified as Makatao)

Based on the latest corpora, Li (2010) attempted two classification trees for Sirayaic languages:

1. Tree based on the number of phonological innovations

 Sirayaic
 Taivoan
 Siraya–Makatao
 Siraya
 Makatao

2. Tree based on the relative chronology of sound changes

 Sirayaic
 Siraya
 Taivoan–Makatao
 Taivoan
 Makatao

Reconstruction 
Adelaar published his reconstruction of Proto-Siraya phonology in 2014:

Sound changes 
Based on the comparison of the available corpora, Adelaar (2014) proposed a summary of sound correspondences between Proto-Austronesian and Proto-Siraya, comapared with Siraya or Taivoan in the 17th century, accompanied with the other three East Formosan languages, Basay, Kavalan, and Amis, proposed by Li (2004):

Comparison chart 
Below is a chart comparing list of numbers of 1–10 in Sirayaic languages, including different dialects of Siraya, Taivoan, and Makatao language, spoken from Tainan to Pingtung in southwestern Taiwan, and from Hualien to Taitung in eastern Taiwan:

Notes

References 

Austronesian languages
Siraya people
Taivoan people
Makatao people